The men's field hockey tournament at the 2004 Summer Olympics was the 20th edition of the field hockey event for men at the Summer Olympic Games. It was held over a thirteen-day period beginning on 15 August, and culminating with the medal finals on 27 August. All games were played at the hockey centre within the Hellinikon Olympic Complex in Athens, Greece.

Australia won the gold medal for the first time after defeating defending champions the Netherlands 2–1 in the final. Germany won the bronze medal by defeating Spain 4–3.

Qualification
Each of the continental champions from five federations received an automatic berth. Alongside the seven teams qualifying through the 2004 Men's Field Hockey Olympic Qualification Tournament, twelve teams competed in this tournament.

Although the host nation would have qualified automatically as well, the International Hockey Federation (FIH) and the International Olympic Committee (IOC) refused to give them an automatic berth due to the standard pf hockey in Greece. Greece appealed the decision to the Court of Arbitration for Sport (CAS), however it was turned down. Greece's first option to gain a place at the Olympics was by qualifying for the EuroHockey Nations Championship held in 2003. As they did not qualify for this tournament their last option was to beat Canada, the last ranked team of the Olympic Qualification Tournament in a best of three play-off competition. Canada would have kept its place in the Qualifier regardless of whether it won or lost against Greece. There would, however, have been six places at stake at the tournament if Greece had qualified, rather than the seven eventually available. Greece lost the first two matches against Canada, losing their chance to qualify to the Olympics.

Umpires

Rosters

Preliminary round
All times are Eastern European Time (UTC+2)

Pool A

Pool B

Classification round

Ninth to twelfth place classification

9–12th place semi-finals

Eleventh place game

Ninth place game

Fifth to eighth place classification

Crossover

Seventh place match

Fifth place match

Medal round

Semi-finals

Bronze medal match

Gold medal match

Final ranking

Goalscorers

References

External links
Official FIH website

 
Field hockey at the 2004 Summer Olympics